Count Stanisław Dunin-Wąsowicz (1785 in Volhynia, Ukraine – 1864 in Paris, France) was a Ukrainian-born Polish general of the November Uprising, Captain  of the 1st Polish Lancers, Napoleon's bodyguard and aide-de-camp during his 1812 Russian Campaign.

On December 5, 1812, with Napoleon's troops in disarray and freezing temperatures taking a heavy toll, Napoleon abandoned his Grand Army at Smarhon (then in the Russian Empire, now in Belarus) and retreated to Paris. Napoleon was accompanied only by a Mameluke bodyguard and Captain (Count) Dunin-Wąsowicz. Napoleon ordered that he should never be allowed to be captured alive and handed Count Dunin-Wąsowicz a set of pistols.

Bibliography
 H. P Kosk Generalicja polska t. 2 wyd. Oficyna Wydawnicza "Ajaks" Pruszków 2001.

References

External links
 Lithuanian Quarterly Journal of Arts and Sciences

1785 births
1864 deaths
Polish generals
Polish commanders of the Napoleonic Wars
Counts of Poland
Polish legionnaires (Napoleonic period)
Polish nobility
Stanislaw
Polish emigrants to France